The Sackville House was a historic building in East Washington, Pennsylvania.  It was located at 309 East Wheeling Street in Washington, Pennsylvania before it was demolished in 1980.

The 17-room building was constructed in 1884 by John Vester.  Ownership of the building passed to Vester's nephew Leo Sackville in 1943.  It was added to the National Register of Historic Places on November 21, 1976.  By the late 1970s, the building had been converted to 3 apartments.  Sackville's widow later sold the building to the Washington & Jefferson College.

As the college's plans for the building's demolition progressed, the Washington County History & Landmarks Foundation and the college discussed the possibility of preserving the building.  However, zoning issues with East Washington, the projected $40,000 costs of moving, and the additional cost to restore the building after being converted to apartments halted that effort.  By 1982, the Olin Fine Arts Center was completed.

The Pennsylvania Historical and Museum Commission's  Bureau for Historic Preservation was notified of the building's demolition on June 1, 2010.  It was formally de-listed from the National Register of Historic Places on August 24, 2010, roughly 20 years after its demolition.

It continues to be designated as a historic residential landmark/farmstead by the Washington County History & Landmarks Foundation.

References

Houses on the National Register of Historic Places in Pennsylvania
Queen Anne architecture in Pennsylvania
Shingle Style houses
Houses completed in 1884
East Washington, Pennsylvania
Houses in Washington County, Pennsylvania
Former National Register of Historic Places in Pennsylvania
Demolished buildings and structures in Pennsylvania
Washington & Jefferson College
National Register of Historic Places in Washington County, Pennsylvania
Buildings and structures demolished in 1980
Shingle Style architecture in Pennsylvania